The following is a list of the 17 cantons of the Vendée department, in France, following the French canton reorganisation which came into effect in March 2015:

 Aizenay
 Challans
 Chantonnay
 La Châtaigneraie
 Fontenay-le-Comte
 Les Herbiers
 L'Île-d'Yeu
 Luçon
 Mareuil-sur-Lay-Dissais
 Montaigu-Vendée
 Mortagne-sur-Sèvre
 La Roche-sur-Yon-1
 La Roche-sur-Yon-2
 Les Sables-d'Olonne
 Saint-Hilaire-de-Riez
 Saint-Jean-de-Monts
 Talmont-Saint-Hilaire

References